Get That Venus is a 1933 American comedy film directed by Arthur Varney and starring Ernest Truex, Jean Arthur and Harry Davenport.

Cast
 Ernest Truex as Tom Wilson 
 Jean Arthur as Margaret Rendleby  
 Harry Davenport as Mr. Rendleby 
 Tom Howard as Joe Smiley  
 Herbert Rawlinson as Editor Nash  
 Molly O'Day as Belle  
 May Vokes as Mrs. Murphy  
 Stanley Harrison as Fishkins 
 Olga Anson as Mrs. Georgina Van Aster 
 Wesley Barry as Bit Part  
 Donald MacBride

References

Bibliography
 Koszarski, Richard. Hollywood on the Hudson: Film and Television in New York from Griffith to Sarnoff. Rutgers University Press, 2008.

External links

1933 films
American comedy films
1933 comedy films
Films directed by Arthur Varney
American black-and-white films
1930s English-language films
1930s American films